NADH dehydrogenase [ubiquinone] flavoprotein 2, mitochondrial (NDUFV2) is an enzyme that in humans is encoded by the NDUFV2 gene. The encoded protein, NDUFV2, is a subunit of complex I of the mitochondrial respiratory chain, which is located on the inner mitochondrial membrane and involved in oxidative phosphorylation. Mutations in this gene are implicated in Parkinson's disease, bipolar disorder, schizophrenia, and have been found in one case of early onset hypertrophic cardiomyopathy and encephalopathy.

Structure 
NDUFV2 is located on the p arm of chromosome 18 in position 11.22 and has 9 exons. The NDUFV2 gene produces a 27.4 kDa protein composed of 249 amino acids. NDUFV2, the protein encoded by this gene, is a member of the complex I 24 kDa subunit family. It contains a cofactor binding site for a 2Fe-2S cluster and a transit peptide domain. The protein consists of 2 turns, 3 beta strands, and 7 alpha helixes. A non-transcribed pseudogene of this locus is found on chromosome 19.

Function 
The NADH-ubiquinone oxidoreductase complex (complex I) of the mitochondrial respiratory chain catalyzes the transfer of electrons from NADH to ubiquinone, and consists of at least 43 subunits. The complex is located in the inner mitochondrial membrane. This gene encodes the 24 kDa subunit of complex I, and is involved in electron transfer. NDUFV2 is an oxidoreductase and a component of the flavoprotein-sulfur (FP) fragment of the enzyme. It is thought to be required for assembly and catalysis.

Catalytic activity 
NADH + ubiquinone + 5 H+(In) = NAD+ + ubiquinol + 4 H+(Out).

NADH + acceptor = NAD+ + reduced acceptor.

Clinical significance 

Mutations in the NDUFV2 gene are associated with Mitochondrial Complex I Deficiency, which is autosomal recessive. This deficiency is the most common enzymatic defect of the oxidative phosphorylation disorders. Mitochondrial complex I deficiency shows extreme genetic heterogeneity and can be caused by mutation in nuclear-encoded genes or in mitochondrial-encoded genes. There are no obvious genotype–phenotype correlations, and inference of the underlying basis from the clinical or biochemical presentation is difficult, if not impossible. However, the majority of cases are caused by mutations in nuclear-encoded genes. It causes a wide range of clinical disorders, ranging from lethal neonatal disease to adult-onset neurodegenerative disorders. Phenotypes include macrocephaly with progressive leukodystrophy, nonspecific encephalopathy, hypertrophic cardiomyopathy, myopathy, liver disease, Leigh syndrome, Leber hereditary optic neuropathy, and some forms of Parkinson disease.

Interactions 
NDUFV2 has been shown to have 102 binary protein-protein interactions including 80 co-complex interactions. NDUFV2 appears to interact with HSCB, CCNC, GOLM1, FAM114A2, CRMP1, KAT5, SP110.

References

Further reading 

 
 
 
 
 
 
 
 
 

Biology of bipolar disorder
Human proteins